Thirsty is a studio album by Marvin Sapp and his fourth release on Verity Records. The album was commercially successful in Gospel Music peaking at number 28 on the U.S. Billboard 200, number 4 on the Top R&B/Hip-Hop Albums, and number 1 on the Top Gospel Albums chart. It has been certified Gold by the RIAA on July 9, 2008 and has sold over 712,000 copies as of March 2010. This is Marvin Sapp's best selling album of his solo career. The song "Praise Him in Advance" was featured on the first disc of the 2010 gospel compilation album WOW Gospel 2010.

Track listing

Credits
Producers:
 Aaron Lindsey - Audio Production, Horn Producer, Producer
 Terrance Jones - Audio Production, Production Assistant
 Vinnie Ciesielski - Audio Production, Horn Producer
 Danny Duncan - Audio Production, Orchestra Production
 Jim Gray - Audio Production, Orchestra Production
 Adrian M. Lindsey - Audio Production, Production Assistant
 Keith Pace - Assistant Engineer, Production Assistant

Executive Producers:
 James Jordan
 MaLinda Sapp
 Marvin Sapp

Arrangers:
 Marvin Sapp
 Aaron Lindsey - Horn Arrangements, Vocal Arrangement
 Myron Butler  Vocal Arrangement

A&R Director:
 Joseph Burney

Worship Leader:
 Marvin Sapp - Worship leader

Musicians:
 Calvin Rodgers – Drums
 Javier Solis – Percussion
 Roy Agee – Trombone
 Jimmy Bolin – Saxophone
 Derrick Horne – Guitar
 Jerry Harris Jr. – Keyboards
 Aaron Lindsey – Keyboards
 Vinnie Ciesielski – Trumpet
 Matthew Brownie - Organ
 Derrick Ray – Bass
 Tim Stewart - Guitar
 Arthur Strong - Keyboards, Organ
 Asian Philharmonic - Orchestra

Vocals: 
 Myron Butler - Vocal Director
 Aisha Cleavers
 Deonis Cook
 Daniel Johnson
 Caltomeesh West
 Chelsea West
 Jamil Whiting

Engineers
 Danny Duncan - Audio Engineer, Engineer
 Ed Ensink - Audio Engineer, Monitor Engineer
 Chris Godbey - Mixing
 Eric Hartman - Engineer
 Israel Ruiz - Audio Engineer
 Aaron Lindsey - Digital Editing, Overdub Engineer, Vocal Engineer
 Vlado Meller - Mastering
 Travis Neuman - Audio Engineer, Monitor Engineer
 Keith Pace - Assistant Engineer, Digital Editing
 Cliff Rosenberg - Assistant Engineer, Audio Engineer
 Chris Yoakum - Horn Engineer
 Zhu 'Jerry' Feng - Audio Engineer, Assistant Engineer
 Lu Di -Concert Master
 Ken Johnson "Snakehips" & His West Indian Dance Band - Production Coordination
 Li Peng - Assistant Concertmaster

Charts

Weekly charts

Year-end charts

Singles

"Never Would Have Made It" ranked number 62 on BET's top 100 videos of 2008.

References

2007 albums
Marvin Sapp albums